Valentin Georgievich Smirtinsky (born 10 June 1944 in Moscow) is a Soviet and Russian stage and film actor. People's Artist of Russia (2005).

Filmography
 Walking the Streets of Moscow (Я шагаю по Москве, 1963) as episode (uncredited)
Seven Old Men and a Girl (Семь стариков и одна девушка, 1968) as Vladimir Tyupin
D'Artagnan and Three Musketeers (д'Артаньян и три мушкетёра, 1978) as Porthos
Visit to Minotaur (Визит к Минотавру, 1987) as Aleksandr Sadomsky
Entrance to the Labyrinth (Вход в лабиринт, 1989) as Yakov Okun
Musketeers Twenty Years After (Мушкетёры двадцать лет спустя, 1992) as Porthos
The Secret of Queen Anne or Musketeers Thirty Years After (Тайна королевы Анны, или Мушкетёры тридцать лет спустя, 1993) as Porthos
The Master and Margarita (miniseries) (Мастер и Маргарита, 2005) as Arkady Apollonovich Sempleyarov
The Return of the Musketeers, or The Treasures of Cardinal Mazarin (Возвращение мушкетёров, или Сокровища кардинала Мазарини, 2009) as Porthos
The Pregnant (Беременный, 2011) as Sergei's father
Brief Guide To A Happy Life (Краткий курс счастливой жизни, 2012) as Ilya Ilyich
 The 101-Year-Old Man Who Skipped Out on the Bill and Disappeared (2016) as Leonid Brezhnev

References

External links

1944 births
Living people
20th-century Russian male actors
21st-century Russian male actors
Male actors from Moscow
Honored Artists of the RSFSR
People's Artists of Russia
Russian male film actors
Russian male stage actors
Russian male television actors
Russian male voice actors
Soviet male film actors

Soviet male stage actors
Soviet male television actors
Soviet male voice actors